Agglutination-PCR (ADAP) is an ultrasensitive solution-phase method for detecting antibodies. Antibodies bind to and agglutinate synthetic antigen–DNA conjugates, enabling ligation of the DNA strands and subsequent quantification by qPCR. Like other Immuno-PCR (IPCR) detection methods ADAP combines the specificity of antibody-antigen recognition and the sensitivity of PCR.  ADAP detects zepto- to attomoles of antibodies in 2 μL of sample with a dynamic range spanning 5–6 orders of magnitude.  For example, ADAP allows to detect anti-thyroglobulin autoantibodies from human patient plasma with a 1000-fold increased sensitivity over an FDA-approved radioimmunoassay. ADAP also allows to simultaneously detect multiple antibodies in one experiment, much more than ELISA or radioimmunoassay.

The study published in the ACS Central Science journal mentioned that this testing method is 10,000 times more effective than the existing diagnostic techniques.

Another advantage of ADAP method is the simplicity. It can be adapted to such a cheap equipment as, for example, SlipChip. It does not require complex and expensive equipment, it does not require working with hazardous radioactive reagents.

References 

Immunologic tests